Dicoryphe is a genus of flowering plants belonging to the family Hamamelidaceae.

Its native range is Madagascar.

Species:

Dicoryphe angustifolia 
Dicoryphe buddlejoides 
Dicoryphe gracilis 
Dicoryphe guatteriifolia 
Dicoryphe lanceolata 
Dicoryphe laurifolia 
Dicoryphe laurina 
Dicoryphe macrophylla 
Dicoryphe noronhae 
Dicoryphe platyphylla 
Dicoryphe retusa 
Dicoryphe stipulacea 
Dicoryphe viticoides

References

Hamamelidaceae
Saxifragales genera